Terryl Lynn Givens is a senior research fellow at the Neal A. Maxwell Institute of Religious Scholarship at Brigham Young University (BYU). Until 2019, he was a professor of literature and religion at the University of Richmond, where he held the James A. Bostwick Chair in English.

Givens is a member of the Church of Jesus Christ of Latter-day Saints (LDS Church). As a young man, he served a mission in Sao Paulo, Brazil, and later graduated from BYU with a degree in comparative literature. He did graduate work in intellectual history at Cornell and earned a PhD in comparative literature from the University of North Carolina, working with Greek, German, Spanish, Portuguese and English languages and literature. A longtime collaborator with his wife, Fiona Givens, he is the co-author of The God Who Weeps: How Mormonism Makes Sense of Life and Crucible of Doubt: Reflections on the Quest for Faith.

The New York Times referred to his work as "polemical" and "provocative" while Harper's praised him for being "fair-minded and unbiased."

Personal life
Givens has served in the LDS Church as a bishop in a local congregation.

Publications

Books 
 Dragon Scales and Willow Leaves. Putnam Juvenile, 1997.  
 The Viper on the Hearth: Mormons, Myths, and the Construction of Heresy. Oxford University Press, 1997.  
 By the Hand of Mormon: The American Scripture that Launched a New World Religion. Oxford University Press, 2002. 
 The Latter-day Saint Experience in America. Greenwood Press, 2004. 
 People of Paradox: A History of Mormon Culture. Oxford University Press, 2007. 
 The Book of Mormon: A Very Short Introduction. Oxford University Press, 2009. 
 When Souls Had Wings: Pre-Mortal Existence in Western Thought. Oxford University Press, 2010. 
 Parley P. Pratt: The Apostle Paul of Mormonism (with Matthew J. Grow). Oxford University Press, 2011. 
 The God Who Weeps: How Mormonism Makes Sense of Life (with Fiona Givens). Ensign Peak, 2012. 
 The Crucible of Doubt: Reflections On the Quest for Faith (with Fiona Givens). Deseret Book, 2014. 
 Wrestling the Angel: The Foundations of Mormon Thought: Cosmos, God, Humanity. Oxford University Press, 2014. 
The Christ Who Heals: How God Restored the Truth that Saves Us (with Fiona Givens). Deseret Book, 2017. 
The Pearl of Greatest Price (with Brian M. Hauglid).  Oxford University Press, 2019.  
All Things New: Rethinking Sin, Salvation, and Everything in Between (with Fiona Givens). Faith Matters Publishing, 2020. 
Mormonism: What Everyone Needs to Know®. Oxford University Press, 2020.

Edited volumes 
 Joseph Smith, Jr.: Reappraisals After Two Centuries (with Reid L. Neilson) Oxford University Press, 2008.  
 The Columbia Sourcebook of Mormons in the United States (with Reid L. Neilson) Columbia University Press, 2014.  
The Oxford Handbook of Mormonism (with Philip L. Barlow)  Oxford University Press, 2015.

Articles and papers 
 Mimesis and the Limits of Semblance. Ph.D. Diss. University of North Carolina at Chapel Hill, 1988
 "Blind Men and Hieroglyphs: The Collapse of Mimesis." European Romantic Review 2.1 (1991): 61–80.
 "Aristotle's Critique of Mimesis: The Romantic Prelude." Comparative Literature Studies 28.2 (1991): 121–136.
 "Romantic Agonies: Human Suffering and the Ethical Sublime." Romanticism Across the Disciplines (1998): 231–53.   
 "'This Great Modern Abomination': Orthodoxy and Heresy in American Religion." Mormons and Mormonism: An Introduction to an American World Religion (2001).  
 "Joseph Smith: Prophecy, Process, and Plenitude." in BYU Studies 44.4 (2005): 55–68.
 "'Lightning Out of Heaven': Joseph Smith and the Forging of Community." BYU Speeches 24 (2005).
 "New Religious Movements and the Orthodoxy: The Challenge to the Religious Mainstream." FARMS Review of Books 19.1 (2007): 201–221.
 "'There Is Room for Both': Mormon Cinema and the Paradoxes of Mormon Culture." BYU Studies 46.2 (2007): 188–208.
 "'Common Sense' Meets the Book of Mormon: Source, Substance and Prophetic Disruption." Revisiting Thomas F. O'Dea's The Mormons: Contemporary Perspectives (2008): 79–98.  
 "Joseph Smith's American Bible: Radicalizing the Familiar." Journal of the Book of Mormon and Other Restoration Scripture 18.2 (2009): 4–17.
 "Paradox and Discipleship." Religious Educator 11.1 (2010): 142–155.
 "Fraud, Philandery, and Football: Negotiating the Mormon Image." International Journal of Mormon Studies 4 (2011): 1–13.
 "The Prophecy of Enoch as Restoration Blueprint" Leonard J. Arrington Mormon History Lecture Series, No. 18 : Utah State University Press, 2013.

References

External links
 Terryl Givens Official Website
 The Mormons PBS Frontline Documentary

1957 births
American historians of religion
American Latter Day Saint writers
American literary critics
American male non-fiction writers
American theologians
Brigham Young University alumni
Historians of the Latter Day Saint movement
Historians of the United States
Living people
Mormon studies scholars
University of North Carolina at Chapel Hill alumni
University of Richmond faculty
Writers from Richmond, Virginia
American leaders of the Church of Jesus Christ of Latter-day Saints
Latter Day Saints from Virginia
Book of Mormon scholars
Historians from Virginia